Dyadobacter koreensis  is a Gram-negative, aerobic, rod-shaped and non-motile bacterium from the genus of Dyadobacter which has been isolated from fresh water from the Woopo wetland in Korea.

References

External links
Type strain of Dyadobacter koreensis at BacDive -  the Bacterial Diversity Metadatabase	

Cytophagia
Bacteria described in 2007